Vikram Prabhu is an Indian actor working in Tamil language films who made his debut in Prabhu Solomon's Kumki (2012). He also played the protagonist in Ivan Veramathiri (2013) and Vellaikaara Durai (2014). He is the son of actor Prabhu and grandson of the veteran actor Sivaji Ganesan.

Career

2012-2015: Early Career and Recognition

Vikram signed on for a venture under the direction Prabhu Solomon's to be produced by N. Linguswamy. Titled Kumki, the film was based on elephants and the director thus sent Vikram to an elephant training camp in Ottapalam in Kerala to get himself accustomed to the animals. The film released in December 2012 to critical acclaim and commercial success, emerging as one of the biggest hits of the year. A critic stated that Prabhu excels in the "intensely emotional scenes in the climax", while that "he is also at ease portraying angst, gratitude and rage". Furthermore, the critic wrote that "his physique is a major plus", giving the verdict that he "is expected to carry on the Ganesan family lineage" in films.

During the making of Kumki, Vikram Prabhu began work in Sattam Oru Iruttarai, a remake of the 1981 film of the same name, produced by Vijay. He began filming and played the role of an angry young man who feels that the legal system is flawed. The film, which began production in May 2012 was directed by Sneha. However the insistence of Prabhu Solomon to reshoot the climax of Kumki, led to the actor leaving Sattam Oru Iruttarai during production and after a period of delay he was replaced by newcomer Thaman Kumar. Subsequently, he signed on to appear in M. Saravanan's action thriller film Ivan Veramathiri and portrayed the role of a student amongst an ensemble cast also featuring Vamsi Krishna and Ganesh Venkatraman. The film opened in December 2013 to positive reviews, with a critic noting that Vikram Prabhu "is convincing as an action hero, especially in the raw and realistic climax fight scene, but has to work on his dance a bit more."

His first 2014 release was the action thriller Arima Nambi, which was directed by Anand Shankar, an assistant director to A. R. Murugadoss. Later that year, he was seen in Gaurav's Sigaram Thodu, a family action entertainer, which featured the actor in two distinct looks and alongside Sathyaraj and Monal Gajjar. He had a third release in 2014, Vellaikaara Durai, directed by Ezhil, that has Sridivya in the cast. This released on Christmas 2014, which was a rom-com and was considered a hit. In 2015, his next movie was Idhu Enna Maayam, a romantic comedy directed by A. L. Vijay. "Despite his good performance, actor Vikram Prabhu looks extremely awkward and out of place as a college student; said Rediff.com's review.

2016-2018: Setback

In July 2016, Vikram Prabhu launched a production house named "First Artist", under which he would produce future films.

His next venture was an action film, Wagah (2016). Sify described; "Vikram Prabhu is earnest in the film and tries hard to rise above a muddled script and poorly written dialogues". His next film was Veera Sivaji (2016). Once again Vikram Prabhu is earnest with his performance but fail to rise above the severely flawed script. In 2017, the gangster thriller Sathriyan was released. Performance wise, Vikram Prabhu is perfect as the angry young man. His body language and dialogue deliver aptly suit his characterization, easily Sathriyan is his comeback film as an actor. Vikram Prabhu has ventured into production through Neruppu Da (2017), and their promotions promised to talk about the hardships and lifestyle of the firemen. After acting in action and serious subjects, Vikram Prabhu appears in a comedy role in his movie Pakka (2018). Vikram Prabhu has played a dual role. The movie has Nikki Galrani in the female lead with Bindu Madhavi' s Tamil fame enacting an important character. Then he appeared in Radha Mohan' s, 60 Vayadu Maaniram (2018) and action thriller Thuppakki Munai (2018).

2020-present

The next was a family ensemble cast led by veterans R. Sarathkumar and Raadhika, in Dhana Sekaran's Vaanam Kottatum (2020). Mani Ratnam producing and also co-writing. Vikram Prabhu's mature and believable performance is complemented by Aishwarya Rajesh. Then, Asuraguru (2020) is a below average heist thriller.

Personal life
Vikram studied in San Diego, completing an MBA programme, and briefly returned to Chennai to help out in the production activities of his family's Sivaji Productions venture, Chandramukhi (2005).

Vikram married Lakshmi Ujjaini, daughter of Industrialist M. Madhivanan, on 26 February 2007. They have two children.

Filmography

Films

Awards
Vijay Award for Best Debut Actor - Kumki (2012)
Tamil Nadu State Film Award Special Prize - Best Actor - Kumki (2012)
SIIMA Award for Best Debut Actor - Kumki (2012)
Audi Ritz icon awards-(2014)

References 

Living people
Film producers from Chennai
Male actors in Tamil cinema
Indian male film actors
21st-century Indian male actors
Male actors from Chennai
South Indian International Movie Awards winners
Year of birth missing (living people)